Simpllag Innondh Love Story is a 2016 Indian Kannada-language romantic-comedy road film written and directed by Suni and featuring stars Praveen Tej, Meghana Gaonkar. It is the spiritual successor of directors debut venture Simple Agi Ondh Love Story (2013). The plot revolves around a love story of two characters, with completely different personalities, who share a road journey.

Plot

Kush, Kushi, and Push are born on the same day, at the same time and in the same hospital. While Kushi's father settles in Karwar, the families of Kush and Push end up as neighbors and run their traditional businesses.

Kushi completes her education in Bangalore and is ready to head back to Karwar. Push is now settled with a job, while Kush is a carefree person. Push's father wants him to marry Kushi, but Push rejects the proposal without even seeing her photo. The proposal then goes to Kush's father, who readily agrees without knowing the name or face of the girl.

After seeing Kushi's photo, Push regrets his decision. He gets Kush to withdraw his decision, by showing him a photo of a different person. He thereafter reverses his decision and agrees to marry Kushi. 

Meanwhile, Kush leaves his house, with his sidekick Tube(aka Govinda), on a stolen test-drive car. He accidentally meets Kushi while she is waiting for a bus to Karwar. He introduces himself as a business tycoon going to Goa via Karwar and suggests her to accompany him, saying that there is a bus strike. She agrees as she is in a hurry to meet her father for a scheduled program. 

What happens next is the crux of the story.

Cast
 Praveen Tej as Kush
 Meghana Gaonkar as Kushi
 Master Hemanth as Govinda aka Tube
 Vijeth as Push 
 Padmaja Rao as Parvathi, Kush Mother 
 Mangalore Suresh as Kushi Father 
 Chidanand as Car showroom manager
 Raksha Shenoy 
 Ravi Bhat as Pranesh, Kush Father 
 Shiva Manju as Govinda Father 
 Shimoga Bhaskar as Push Father

Soundtrack
Songs composed by Bharath BJ and released under label of Lahari Music.

Tracklist

References

External links
 

2016 films
2010s Kannada-language films
2016 romantic comedy films
Indian romantic comedy films
Films directed by Suni